Schenckiella is a genus of fungi in the Asterinaceae family. The relationship of this taxon to other taxa within the class is unknown (incertae sedis), and it has not yet been placed with certainty into any order. It is a monotypic genus, containing the single species Schenckiella marcgraviae.

The genus was circumscribed by Paul Christoph Hennings in 1893.

The genus name of Schenckiella is in honour of Johann Heinrich Rudolf Schenck (1860–1927), who was a German botanist and native of Siegen. He was a brother to geographer Adolf Schenck (1857–1936).

References

External links

Asterinaceae
Monotypic Dothideomycetes genera